Edward Michael "Mike"/"Spanky" Fincke (born March 14, 1967) is an American astronaut who formerly held the American record for the most time in space (381.6 days). His record was broken by Scott Kelly on October 16, 2015.

Mike Fincke was born in Pittsburgh, Pennsylvania, but considers its suburb Emsworth to be his hometown. He is a retired United States Air Force officer and an active NASA astronaut.  So far he served two tours aboard the International Space Station as a flight engineer and commander. He flew on one Space Shuttle mission, STS-134 as a mission specialist.  Fincke is conversant in Japanese and Russian. He is married to Renita Saikia, and together they have three children; son Chandra and daughters Tarali and Surya.

Fincke logged just under 382 days in space, placing him second among American astronauts for the most time in space, and 20th overall. He completed nine spacewalks in Russian Orlan spacesuits and American EMUs.  His total EVA time is 48 hours and 37 minutes, placing him 14th all time on the list of spacewalkers.

Education
Fincke graduated from Sewickley Academy in Sewickley, Pennsylvania, in 1985. He attended the Massachusetts Institute of Technology on an Air Force ROTC scholarship and graduated in 1989 with a Bachelor of Science degree in aeronautics and astronautics as well as a Bachelor of Science degree in Earth, atmospheric and planetary sciences. He then received a Master of Science degree in aeronautics and astronautics from Stanford University in 1990, and a second Master of Science degree in planetary geology from the University of Houston–Clear Lake in 2001. He also attended El Camino College in Torrance, California, where he studied Japanese and geology.

Career
Immediately after graduating from MIT in 1989, Fincke attended a summer exchange program with the Moscow Aviation Institute in the former Soviet Union, now Russia, where he studied Cosmonautics. After graduation from Stanford University in 1990, Fincke entered the United States Air Force where he was assigned to the Air Force Space and Missiles Systems Center, Los Angeles Air Force Base in California.  There he served as a Space Systems Engineer and a Space Test Engineer.  In 1994, upon completion of the U.S. Air Force Test Pilot School, Edwards Air Force Base in California, Fincke joined the 39th Flight Test Squadron, Eglin Air Force Base in Florida, where he served as a flight test engineer working on a variety of flight test programs, flying the F-16 and F-15 aircraft. In January 1996, he reported to the Gifu Test Center, Gifu Air Base in Japan, where he was the United States flight test liaison to the Japanese/United States XF-2 fighter program. By 2005, Fincke had accumulated over 800 flight hours in more than 30 different varieties of aircraft and held the rank of colonel. Fincke belongs to the Geological Society of America and the British Interplanetary Society.

NASA career
Fincke was selected by NASA in April 1996 to be an astronaut. He reported to the Johnson Space Center in August 1996. Having completed two years of training and evaluation, he was assigned technical duties in the Astronaut Office Station Operations Branch serving as an International Space Station spacecraft communicator (ISS CAPCOM), a member of the Crew Test Support Team in Russia and as the ISS crew procedures team lead.

In July 1999, Fincke was assigned as backup crewmember for the International Space Station Expedition 4 crew. Additionally he served as a backup for the ISS Expedition 6 crew and is qualified to fly as a left-seat flight engineer (co-pilot) on the Russian Soyuz spacecraft. He was the commander of the second NASA Extreme Environment Mission Operations (NEEMO 2) mission, living and working underwater for 7 days in May 2002.

In 2013, Fincke served as cavenaut into the ESA CAVES training in Sardinia, alongside Soichi Noguchi, Andreas Mogensen, Nikolai Tikhonov, Andrew Feustel and David Saint-Jacques.

Expedition 9

Fincke was the space station science officer and flight engineer for ISS Expedition 9 from April 18 through October 23, 2004. Expedition 9 was launched from the Baikonur Cosmodrome, Kazakhstan aboard the Soyuz TMA-4 spacecraft, and docked with the International Space Station on April 21, 2004. Fincke spent six months aboard the ISS continuing ISS science operations, maintaining station systems, and performing four spacewalks. The Expedition-9 mission concluded with undocking from the station and safe landing back in Kazakhstan on October 23, 2004. Fincke completed his first mission in 187 days, 21 hours and 17 minutes, and logged a total of 15 hours, 45 minutes and 22 seconds of EVA time in four spacewalks.

Fincke was the backup commander for Expedition 13 and Expedition 16.

Expedition 18

Fincke was commander of Expedition 18. He arrived at the International Space Station aboard the Soyuz TMA-13 on October 14, 2008, with Cosmonaut Yuri Lonchakov and space flight participant Richard Garriott. While Richard Garriott was aboard, Fincke participated during his personal time (along with Yury Lonchakov, Gregory Chamitoff and Richard Garriott) in filming and starring in a science-fiction movie made in space, Apogee of Fear. On April 8, 2009, Fincke, Lonchakov and space tourist Charles Simonyi returned to Earth aboard the TMA-13.

Replacing Fincke as commander of the space station was Gennady Padalka, whom Fincke served with on Expedition 9.

STS-134
Fincke was a mission specialist on STS-134, which was his first and only flight on a Space Shuttle. Fincke made three spacewalks during the mission. He has completed 26 hours and 12 minutes of spacewalking time, bringing his total EVA time to 48 hours and 37 minutes. This places him 11th all time on the list of spacewalkers.

Commercial Crew Program
On January 22, 2019, NASA announced that Fincke would fly on Boeing CST-100 Starliner’s Crew Flight Test currently scheduled for 2022. The Starliner’s Crew Flight Test will be the first time that the new spacecraft, which is being developed and built by Boeing as part of NASA’s Commercial Crew Program, is launched into space with humans on board. Fincke took the place of astronaut Eric Boe, who was originally assigned to the mission in August 2018 but is now unable to fly due to medical reasons. Boe will replace Fincke as the assistant to the chief for commercial crew in the astronaut office at NASA’s Johnson Space Center. On 18 April 2022, NASA said that it has not finalized which of the cadre of Starliner astronauts, including Barry Wilmore, Fincke, and Sunita Williams, will actually fly on the CFT mission or the first operational Starliner mission. On 16 June 2022, NASA confirmed that CFT will be a two-person flight test, consisting of Wilmore and Williams. Fincke will now train as the backup spacecraft test pilot and remains eligible for assignment to a future mission.

Acting
 Fincke was a guest star on the final episode of Star Trek: Enterprise along with fellow astronaut Terry Virts.
 He was also featured in the Star Trek: First Contact Blu-ray special features, talking about what it is like to work in space and how Star Trek influences people to believe in the magic of space travel.
 Fincke appeared in The Wiggles video Wiggle Around the Clock (2006), demonstrating a space suit.
 Fincke voiced himself in the Season 14 Arthur episode "Buster Spaces Out".
 Fincke also appeared in Man on a Mission: Richard Garriott's Road to the Stars, a documentary based on Richard Garriott's Spaceflight as a fellow astronaut who launched to the ISS with Garriott on a Soyuz Spacecraft

Awards and decorations

 Distinguished graduate from the United States Air Force ROTC, Squadron Officer School and Test Pilot School Programs
 Recipient of the United States Air Force Test Pilot School Colonel Ray Jones Award as the top Flight Test Engineer/Flight Test Navigator in class 93B
 Recipient of the Sewickley Academy Distinguished Alumnus/a Award in 2005

References

External links 

 
 NASA biography
 Spacefacts biography of Mike Fincke
 International Space Station Tour (part 1 of 4)
 Interview with The Scholars' Avenuve, IIT Kharagpur

1967 births
Living people
Aquanauts
Crew members of the International Space Station
Fincke, Edward Michael
Military personnel from Pittsburgh
Space systems engineers
United States Air Force officers
University of Houston–Clear Lake alumni
MIT School of Engineering alumni
U.S. Air Force Test Pilot School alumni
United States Air Force astronauts
Sewickley Academy alumni
Space Shuttle program astronauts
Spacewalkers